Micropterix allionella is a moth of the family Micropterigidae. It was described by Johan Christian Fabricius in 1794.

Distribution
This species is present in France, Italy, Germany, Switzerland, Austria, the Czech Republic, Slovakia, Bulgaria, Croatia, Slovenia and former Yugoslavia.

Habitat
These moths live in clearings and in the outskirts of forests. They usually fly in tall herbaceous vegetation.

Description
Head is black brown, with hairy-like yellow scales. Forewings are purplish violet with broad transversal golden fasciae, an outer golden margin and a small costal golden spot. This species is very similar to Micropterix rothenbachii, that have broader golden fasciae.

Bibliography
Fabricius, J. C. (1794): Entomologia systematica emendata et aucta. Secundum classes, ordines, genera, species adjectis synonimis, locis, observationibus, descriptionibus 3 (2): 1-349. Hafniae (C. G. Proft, Fil. et Soc.).

References

Moths of Europe
Micropterigidae
Moths described in 1794
Taxa named by Johan Christian Fabricius